Batman is a city and capital of Batman District in Batman Province, Turkey. It is populated by Kurds.

The Batı Raman oil field, which is the largest oil field in Turkey, is located just outside the city. Batman has a local airport and a military airbase, which was used for transit of aircraft and helicopters in some search and rescue operations during the Gulf War.

Until the 1950s, Batman was a village, with a population of about 3,000. However, oil fields were discovered around it in the 1940s that resulted in a rapid development of the area and in the inflow of workforce from other parts of Turkey. In 1957, the village was renamed Batman, after the river namesake, received a city status and became a district center. Over the next 50 years, a significant amount of Batman's one-story buildings were rebuilt as multi-story buildings. As a result, its population grew to many times its previous size. A  km long oil pipeline was built in 1967 from Batman to the port city of Dörtyol near the easternmost point of the Mediterranean coast in order to transport the crude oil from the Batman refinery. In 1990, the city became the capital of Batman Province.

Apart from oil, which is by far the dominant commodity of the region, Batman produces beverages, processed food, chemicals, furniture, footwear, machinery and transport equipment. A university was established in 2007, Batman University, and is part of the Erasmus foreign student exchange program.

History

Early history 
The Batman Province contains the strategic Tigris River with fertile lands by its sides, as well as rocky hills with numerous caves providing a natural shelter. As a result, it was inhabited from prehistoric times, likely from the Neolithic (Paleolithic) period, according to archeological evidence. First documented evidence of settlements in the province dates back to the 7th century BC. An artificial "island" was created in this marshy area, which was named elekhan and stood independent for 194 years from 546 BC until the invasion of Alexander the Great in 352 BC. The Batman Province was a religious center in the 4th–6th centuries AD and was part of the Byzantine Empire for seven centuries. In the 11th–12th centuries became under the control of the Great Seljuq Empire and Artuqids and became a prominent outpost of the Silk Road. This area was populated by Syriac Christians and had a significant presence of Pontic Greeks, Assyrians, Baghdadi Jews and Armenians; these peoples lived in the region from 500 BC to the late 19th century. Significant changes in its management and language were brought in 1515 by Mahmoud Pasha Elekhani. It is believed that a variant of his name, Elah, was transformed into Iluh and gave the old name to the Batman city.

Modern history 

The locality was made the capital of a district in the Siirt Province in 1957 and as the Batman province was founded in May 1990, also its capital. The city was connected with Istanbul in 1944 by a railway line. This was the major transportation route until the 1950s when highways gradually became more important. Until the 1950s, Batman was a village of some 3,000 people; it was called Iluh and belonged to the Siirt Province. It was first located in the Elmedin district of Siirt. The entire district disappeared in the early 1926 due to the flood of the Batman River. After that, Iluh became part of Beşiri sub-province. On 2 September 1957, the village became a district center and renamed Batman after the river flowing nearby, which was known under its modern name since at least the 19th century. On 16 May 1990 it was designated the capital of the Batman Province.

This administrative evolution reflected the rapid growth of the city owing to its oil extraction and refinement industries. Oil was found in the region in the 1930s and the oldest in Turkey refinery was built in 1955 to process crude oil of the Raman and Garzan areas. The refinery is operated by Tüpraş, it has a processing capacity of 1.1 million tonnes per year and storage capacity of 253 billion m3.

Development of the oil fields outside the city resulted in a rapid growth of Batman beginning in the 1950s. As a result, the city was declared a "Priority Region for Development". A high school was established in the city in 1975 and most one-story houses were rebuilt into multi-story buildings. However, the large inflow of labor for the oil industry resulted in construction of hundreds of unauthorized small buildings on the outskirts of the city. Because of the wind direction, most industrial complexes were located in the southern and south-eastern areas.

Kurdish–Turkish conflict 
The oil-related development of Batman also resulted in relocation of Turkish people into a mostly Kurd-populated Batman Province. This has brought ethnic conflicts that escalated in the 1990s. More than 180 civilians were killed in the Batman city area by unidentified gunmen between 1992 and 1993. In June 2000, the then-Mayor Abdullah Akın attempted to rename up to 200 streets, and give them names of events of the Kurdish history or of people who supported the Kurdish culture. A Turkish court did not allow some names, but other names passed. In 2010 the city was the location for the first Kurdish film festival in Turkey. In the opening ceremony a letter of the imprisoned mayor Nejdet Atalay was read out in the Kurdish language highlighting the struggles the Kurds have to go through in Turkey that does not recognize the Kurdish language.

Politics
In the local elections in December 1977, a candidate who openly supported Kurdish rights, Edip Sönmez, won the elections. He was murdered in 1979. The Kurdish Mayors Abdullah Akın (1999–2002), Hüseyin Kalkan (2002–2009) and Nejdet Atalay have all faced prosecutions and were in prison. The former mayor of Batman Nejdet Atalay, was a member of the Democratic Society Party (DTP) until the Constitutional Court of Turkey banned that party on 11 December 2009 for alleged ties to the Kurdistan Workers' Party. This decision banned him and 35 other members of the now-disbanded political party from joining any political party for five years. In 2014 Sabri Özdemir won the elections. But he was suspended as mayor in October 2015 for "Self governance" remarks and later dismissed.

In the local elections of March 2019, Mehmet Demir was elected Mayor of Batman, but on 23 February 2020, he was dismissed and a trustee was appointed. Kaymakam is Osman Bilici.

Demographics
According to the national census data collected between 1990 and 2000, the population of Batman is growing at a rate of 5% per year. By 2008, it reached a population of 298,342, with a male to female ratio of 1.015. According to the 2000 census, about 50% of population is married and has about 5 children per family. About 5 people are living together in one house as family. The unemployment rate is about 20% for males and 10% for females. Kurdish is the main first-language in the city.

Industry

Batman's primary commodity is oil, as there are multiple oil fields in the nearby area. These oil fields have spurred the creation of multiple pipelines to transmit oil to and from several important cities. Apart from oil, which is by far the dominant commodity of the region, Batman produces beverages, processed food, chemicals, furniture, footwear, machinery and transport equipment.

Oil fields 
Search for oil in the Batman Province started in 1935. The first experimental well began producing 10 tonnes (about ) of oil per day on 6 June 1940. The field was set to be expanded for commercial production by 1945, but the production was delayed to 1947 due to the lack of storage. To solve this, a small refinery was built at the site with a capacity of 9 tonnes/day in 1947, and in November 1948 a bigger refinery capable of processing up to 200 tonnes/day was completed in Batman. An even bigger refinery (330 tonnes/d) was completed in Batman in 1955.

Pipelines 
A  km long oil pipeline was built in 1967 from Batman to Dörtyol, a port city located near the easternmost point of the Mediterranean coast, to transport the crude oil from the Batman region. Both pipelines are operated by BOTAŞ.

Education and sports

Education 
According to the census of 2000, 15% males and 43% females of Batman were categorized as illiterate. Within the literate part, about 33% males and 29% females have not finished secondary school, 3.3% males and 0.9% females had university education, and about 13% males and 3.8% females had completed a high-school or an equivalent program. There are 71 elementary and 12 high schools in Batman.

Batman University 
The city also has a university, Batman University, which was founded on 27 May 2007. It employs about 140 staff members and has the faculties of Science and Letters, Technical Education, and Engineering, which mostly cover topics about engineering, business, and administration. About 2,500 students, who come from different parts of Turkey, study at the university. The university is part of the Erasmus foreign student exchange program.

Sports 
Association football is the most popular sport in Batman. The city has a professional football club, Batman Petrolspor, which was formed in 1960 and plays in the third division TFF Third League. The club was named after the petroleum industry of the city. Another local football team, 72 Batmanspor, participates in the Amateur League. There is a football stadium in Batman, which has a seating capacity of 4,900 spectators.

Another popular sport is wrestling. Freestyle wrestlers from Batman have won national competitions, and Ali Riza Alan won gold in 1970 and silver in 1974 in world championships in the weight category under . The major sport venue of Batman, Atatürk Sports Hall, can accommodate 1,000 spectators and supports many athletics, such as badminton, basketball, gymnastics, wrestling, folk dance, handball, martial arts (such as kurash, judo, aikido, wushu, karate and taekwondo), table tennis, volleyball and swimming.

Transportation
Batman is connected by highways and railway with the nearby cities of Diyarbakır and Kurtalan and with the capital Ankara. The airport is combined with the military Batman Air Base. The base was renovated after the US-Turkey agreement in 1982 to make the base available for US tactical aircraft acting within NATO forces. This allowed them to patrol the region of Caucasus, Turkey and Iran without refueling. The base was then used for aid delivery and rescue missions in Iraq during the 1991 Gulf War.

Geography

There are almost no forests in and around the city. The Iluh River, a tributary of the Batman River, flows through the city. The soil mostly consists of soft and porous clay; it is unstable and is easily eroded with rain and floods of the Batman and Iluh rivers. The floods usually occur between March and May, although they sometimes occur between October and November. Major floods occurred in 1969 (April, 60 buildings damaged), 1972 (April and May, 210 buildings damaged), 1991 (November, 500 buildings flooded), 1995 (March, nearly 1000 buildings submerged and 450 damaged) and 2006 (October, 11 people died and 20 injured).

Climate 
Batman has a hot summer Mediterranean climate (Köppen: Csa, Trewartha: Cs). Summers in the city are, on average, one of the hottest in the nation, averaging  in July. Rainfall is almost non-existent during the summer months, with many summer months passing by without measurable precipitation. Winters are cool and wet with frosty nights.

Notable people
Ali Rıza Alan – world champion (1970) in freestyle wrestling.
İbrahim Bilgen – Turkish politician
Hüseyin Kalkan
Nalin Pekgul – Swedish politician
Mehmet Şimşek – Minister of Finance of Turkey
Karapetê Xaço – Armenian singer of traditional Kurdish dengbêj music.

References

Bibliography

External links

 GAP Project page re Batman
 Batman Province Guide
Batman University Website

 
Cities in Turkey
Populated places in Batman Province
Populated places on the Tigris River

Turkish Kurdistan
Kurdish settlements in Batman Province
Batman District